Ca Huế (Chữ Hán: 歌化, "Huế songs") is a form of classical Vietnamese music of Central Vietnam, particularly the Huế region. It contrasts with the ca trù genre to the North, and the đờn ca tài tử "gifted scholar" style to the South. The singer sings solo, as in the ca trù genre, accompanying herself with small wooden clappers, sometimes similar to the phách sticks used in ca trù, sometimes shaped like small teacups.

Before and between the solo songs a traditional ensemble plays instrumental sections to complement the singer. The ca huế ensemble should be of five excellent instruments, ngũ tuyệt.

References

Vietnamese traditional theatre
Vietnamese music